Endel Pärn (21 April 1914 Saint Petersburg – 24 April 1990 Tallinn) was an Estonian actor and singer.

From 1931 until 1942, he was an actor in Vanemuine Theatre in Tartu. From 1942 until 1986 he was an actor and operetta singer at the Estonia Theatre. He also played in several films, including three Sulev Nõmmik directed comedies, Mehed ei nuta (1969), Noor pensionär (1972), and  Siin me oleme! (1979).

Awards:
 1964 Merited Artist of Estonian SSR
 1984 Paul Pinna Award

Roles

 1929: Young Margus (August Kitzberg's Libahunt)
 1932: Cadet Bobbie Flipps (Paul Abraham's The Flower of Hawaii)
 1932: Sebastian (William Shakespeare's Twelfth Night, or What You Will)

References

1914 births
1990 deaths
Estonian male stage actors
Estonian male film actors
20th-century Estonian male singers
20th-century Estonian male actors
Burials at Rahumäe Cemetery
Soviet male actors